Josip Barišić (born 12 August 1983) is a retired Bosnian professional footballer who last played as a centre-back for Bosnian Premier League club Posušje.

Club career
In his career, Barišić played for his hometown club Posušje in which he returned after a short spell at Zagreb. He played in 95 league matches and scored 8 goals for his first club before and after that. Then he joined Široki Brijeg as a free player. He was transferred to Hajduk Split in 2011 for 150,000 € and signed a three-and-a-half-year contract with the Split based team.

After Hajduk, Barišić played for a short period at Imotski, but shortly after returned to Široki Brijeg. In May 2017, Barišić won his first trophy with Široki Brijeg, the 2016–17 Bosnian Cup after beating Sarajevo in the final. On 2 June 2020, he decided to leave Široki Brijeg seven years after returning to the club.

On 22 June 2020, Barišić came back to Posušje and signed a contract with the club.

International career
In 2010, Barišić was called up to the Bosnia and Herzegovina national team and made his debut for the team on 10 December 2010 in a friendly match against Poland in Antalya, Turkey.

Honours
Široki Brijeg
Bosnian Cup: 2016–17

References

External links

Josip Barišić at Sofascore

1983 births
Living people
People from Posušje
Croats of Bosnia and Herzegovina
Association football central defenders
Bosnia and Herzegovina footballers
Bosnia and Herzegovina international footballers
HŠK Posušje players
NK Široki Brijeg players
HNK Hajduk Split players
NK Imotski players
Premier League of Bosnia and Herzegovina players
Croatian Football League players
First League of the Federation of Bosnia and Herzegovina players
Bosnia and Herzegovina expatriate footballers
Expatriate footballers in Croatia
Bosnia and Herzegovina expatriate sportspeople in Croatia